Tan Yang Peng, professionally known as TAN (born November 26, 1990) is a Malaysian pop singer and songwriter from Penang, Malaysia.

Early life 
In 2001, Tan was the season one Top 8 finalist of Astro reality competition “Astro Kids Talent Quest”. In 2008 he gained interested in Recording Arts and took a certificate program under Full Sail / Hits Studio in Penang, Malaysia. In 2009, he took certificate program in Songwriting and Guitar Performance with Berklee College of Music Online Extension. He is a vocal graduate of Musicians Institute in Hollywood.

A Summer to Remember EP 

On December 4, 2013, Tan released his debut single Heat Wave, which debuted on Malaysia's iTunes Top 100 Charts. The single was co-written and produced by American record producer Mario Marchetti (Demi Lovato, Jennifer Lopez). The music video was released on January 16, 2014, starring American actress and model Chelsea Heath and directed by Patrick “Embryo” Tapu.

On March 6, 2014, Tan released his debut EP A Summer to Remember which was also produced by Mario Marchetti, Amit Ofir of Abused Romance and mastered by Grammy winner Evren Göknar at Capitol Studios in Hollywood.

Achievements 
TAN was listed as one of the Hot 100 Live Unsigned Artists & Bands by Music Connection. In May 2015, he was the finalist of the International Songwriting Competition in the Pop/Top 40 Category and won the honorable mention award.

References

1990 births
Living people
Malaysian male pop singers